Sızma is a town in Konya Province, Turkey. (Undotted ı is pronounced as e in the word Open)

Geography

Sızma is a town in Selçuklu second-level municipality in Greater Konya. It is a few kilometers west of the main road connecting Konya to Afyon. The population is 2153 as of 2011

History

There are ruins of Hitites and Roman Empire in the vicinity. But the town was founded by a group of Yörüks (nomadic Oghuz Turks) in the Middle Ages. The earliest name was Sizemene; but later on, it  was shortened to Sızma.

Economy

There is an abandoned mercury mine in Sızma with the ore grade of 0.6 to 1% that was once a major economic activity of the town. Likewise carpet weaving is also declining. Presently, the main economic activity is agriculture (cereals) and animal husbandry.

References

Populated places in Konya Province
Towns in Turkey
Selçuklu District